In Irish mythology, Naisi, Noíse or Noisiu (modern spelling: Naoise ) was the nephew of King Conchobar mac Nessa of Ulster, and a son of Uisneach (or Uisliu). He is mentioned in the tale known as the Tragic Tale of the Sons of Uisnech, or Exiles of the Sons of Uisnech, usually found within the set of stories in the Táin Bó Cúailnge, part of the Ulster Cycle.

In the tale he becomes the lover of Deirdre, a woman of great beauty, who is also desired by the king of Ulster Conchobar mac Nessa - as a consequence the lovers with Naoise's two brothers go into exile in Scotland (Alba). Eventually, Conchobar seeks to get them to return, but a series of unfortunate events (including a geas placed on Fergus mac Róich their protector and escort, as well as Naoise and his brothers' repeated disregard for Deirdre's prophetic warnings) and the treachery of Conchobar brought on by his desire for Deirdre, leads to tragedy.

The tale climaxes with battle at the Red Branch house at Emain Macha, with many dead including Naoise, his brothers Ainle and Ardan, and Conchobar's son Fiacha. Ultimately the sons of Uisnech are killed in one blow delivered by Maine Red Hand son of the King of Norway (or by Éogan mac Durthacht depending on source). The whole event leads to considerable strife between Ulster and Connacht, the disinheritance of Conchobar and his descendants to the title King of Ulster, and the destruction of Emain Macha.

Mythic biography
Naoise's and Deirdre's story appears in the Táin Bó Cúailnge (Cattle raid of Cooley), in the story part sometimes entitled "The Tragical Death of the Sons of Usnach".

When Deirdre was born, Cathbad the druid named her, and prophesied that she would cause much trouble and strife - on hearing this the assembled lords would have had her killed then, but  king Conchobar prevented it and decided to have her brought up in seclusion, and that when she was old enough, he would marry her. She grew up to outshine other women of the time in beauty.

One snowy day when she saw her foster father kill a calf, on which a raven fell to drink the animals blood - she said she wanted a husband who had in him the three colors she saw - hair the color of the raven, cheeks red like the calf's blood, and skin the color of snow. She was told that such a man existed in the house of Conchobar - named Naisi (Naoise), son of Usnach, son of Conall Flatnailed, son of Rury the Great. She asked that she might speak with him, in secret. Naisi met with her, and she declared her love for him, and asked to elope, which he agreed to, though he was tardy to carry out, for fear of Conchobar.

Thus Naisi and his two brothers Ainle and Ardan together with and one hundred and fifty warriors went to Scotland and entered the paid service of the King of Scotland. The Scottish King heard of Deirdre's great beauty and too tried to get her for himself, on which Naisi and his brothers left for an island in the sea, after many battles with the king's men.

Conchobar was at another feast with his people, and asked them if they wanted for anything. They replied they had no want, except the loss of their kinsmen Naisi, Ainle, and Ardan - because of the woman Deirdre. Having heard this Conchobar decided to send an envoy. However Naisi was prohibited from returning to Ireland except with either Cúchulainn, Conall Cernach, or Fergus mac Ross. Conchobar chose Fergus to go fetch for them.

Fergus journeyed to Loch Etive in Alba (Scotland), and found the hunting lodges of the Naisi and his two brothers, but there was no recent sign of them. Fergus then went to the harbor and made a loud call for them, which was heard by Naisi and Deirdre. Naisi said he had heard an Irish voice, and so had Deirdre, but she lied and said she thought it was a Scottish voice. Fergus called again, and the same happened; and then a third time, and Naisi became sure it was Fergus' voice and asked Ardan to go and meet him.

Deirdre confessed that she had recognized the voice, but concealed the truth as she had a vision the previous night, of three birds from Emain Macha bringing honey in their beaks but returning with blood in their beaks - she interpreted this as meaning that the messenger came with a false promise of peace. Nevertheless, they greeted Fergus warmly, and he then told him of his task as envoy, to make them return to Ulster. The exiles spoke of their missing Ireland, but Deirdre still did not wish to go out of worry - Fergus promised he would give them his protection against any in Ireland, and so Naisi agreed to return.

On the way they came to the fort of Borrach (son of Annte). Borrach welcomed them, and offered a feast (as Conchobar had instructed him to do), but placed Fergus under a geasa not to leave the feast until it was finished. Fergus became flustered, telling Borrach that he had promised to bring the three back to Emain Macha on the same day that they returned to Ireland. Fergus decided to stay at the feast and send his own two sons with the returning exiles back to Emain Macha.

The exiles left Borrach's place. Deirdre counseled Naisi to stay at the island of Cuilenn, but Fergus's sons (Illann the Fair, and Buinne the Ruthless Red) spoke against it. Then they went to the White Cairn of Watching on Slaib Fuad, but Deirdre fell behind, and fell asleep. Naisi turned back and found her as she awoke from a dream. She told Naisi of her dream - in it she sees Naisi and Illann headless, but Buinne not with them. Next the party went to Ard na Sailech. Again Deirdre had premonitions, envisioning a 'cloud of blood' over Naisi, Ainle, and Ardan's head. She counselled that they should go to Dún Delgan (Dundalk) and stay until Fergus could join them, or seek Cúchulainn as escort, but the brothers were not worried, and did not follow her advice.

They then went straight to Emain Macha. On reaching it Deirdre foretold a way they could tell whether or not Concobar would do them ill - if they were invited into Cochobar's house they were safe, but if they were invited into the house of the Red Branch without Concobar then evil was intended for them.

At Emain Macha they knocked, and on telling the doorman who it was Concobar said to send them to the Red Branch house. Deirdre suggested they leave, but the men would not, lest they be called timid. They entered the house of the Red Branch, and were served with great food and drink - all the servants drank and ate and became merry, but the exiles would not eat or drink. Naisi then called for Concobar's chessboard (the Cennchaem) to be brought so they could play - at the same time Conchobar inquired of Deirdre, asking if she was still so beautiful. Concobar's envoy (Levarcham) returned and told him who was there, and that Deirdre was changed from when she left.

Conchobar sent messengers to tell him of Deirdre's appearance twice more. Then he spoke to Tréndorn saying "do you know who killed my father (and three brothers)?" - Tréndhorn replied it was Naisi - then Conchobar sent him report on Deirdre's appearance. As he spied through a window he was spotted, and Naisi threw a chess piece at him so well he lost an eye - he returned to Conchobar and told him "The woman whose form and feature are loveliest in the world is there, and Naisi would be king of the world if she were left to him." Conchobar became enraged and ordered an assault on the Red Branch house.

A the house Conchobar and his men, and the Naisi and his exchanged words, then fighting began. Buinne slew many of Conchobar's men, but Conchobar asked his price, and bribed him with land, and he deserted his companions. The Illann came forth and killed many of Conchobar's men, and would not take a bribe like his brother. Conchobar asked for his own son Fiacha, born on the same night as Illann. He gave Fiacha his arms, but after a hard fight, Illann won. Conchobar's shield made a great sound when its wielder was in distress, and Conall son of Amargin heard it, thinking Conchobar was in need, and came - seeing the scene of the battle he took his spear (Culghlas) and killed Illann. Wounded, Illann asked who had done it, and told them he was there to guard Naisi and his brothers - on hearing this Conall was sorry, and killed Fiacha in revenge. Illann called Naisi to the fight, then died.

Ardan defended the Red Branch house on the first night, slaying many; the next night Ainle defended; on the third night Naisi defended, also killing many attackers. The three then formed a shield around Deirdre, and leapt outside the walls of Emain. Concobar told his druid Cathbad to put an enchantment on the escapees, stating that if he did so he would not harm the. Cathad conjured water to prevent them. Concobar then called for someone to kill Naisi but none from Ulster would. However one Maine Red-hand from Norway, whose father and brothers had been killed by Naisi, was willing to do the beheading.

Ardan said he should die first, as the youngest, but Ainle offered himself; Naisi gave his exceptional sword, which was from Manannán mac Lir himself, to Maine, and Maine killed all three with it, in one blow. Deirdre kissed her dead husband and drank his blood, and sang a long lament. She then flung herself into Naisi's grave and died.

Cathbad cursed Emain Macha because of the evil of that day, and said that neither Conchobar nor his descendants would ever possess it again. Fergus came the next day, and saw the disaster, and (together with Cormac conloinggeas and Dubhtach daelultach) gave battle to Conchobar, brought the destruction of Emain Macha, together with Conchobar's women. Fergus then sought aid from Ailill King of Connacht, and Maeve the queen. Much of Ulster was raided or destroyed, with hostilities continuing for several years.

Other sources
The tale is also found in the "Glenmasan manuscript" version of the Táin Bó Flidhais.

Cultural references
Naoise appears in many interpretations of the story of Deirdre and the sons of Uisnech, such as W.B. Yeats 1907 Deirdre. For others see Deirdre.

Notes

References

Sources

Further reading 
 
 Hemming, Jessica. "Red, White, and Black in Symbolic Thought: The Tricolour Folk Motif, Colour Naming, and Trichromatic Vision." Folklore 123, no. 3 (2012): 310-29. Accessed June 20, 2020. www.jstor.org/stable/41721562.

Ulster Cycle